"Tease Me" is a song by Jamaican reggae duo Chaka Demus & Pliers, released in 1993 as the first single from their fourth album of the same name (1993). It was a top-20 hit in at least six countries, peaking at No. 3 in the UK, and No. 5 in Australia and the Netherlands. The song also reached number two on the UK Dance Singles Chart and number one on the European Dance Radio Chart.

Critical reception
Larry Flick from Billboard wrote, "Leave it to this savvy duo to find a different route for its pop-drenched reggae attitude. Hip-shaking staccato beats are prominent in an arrangement of loopy horns and playful vocals. In its original form, this bright and sunny tune will breathe fresh air into any station it graces." In his weekly UK chart commentary, James Masterton noted, "Latest ragga hit to come out of nowhere is this one. From the Shabba Ranks school of mellow laidback dancehall it makes a startling debut." Neil Spencer from The Observer complimented the song as "itchy".

Brad Beatnik from the RM Dance Update commented, "The waves caused by Shaggy and this duo's previous hit "Murder She Wrote" should make this a surefire crossover hit. Its sparse rhythm and chugging chorus will make it irresistible on the floor." Another editor, James Hamilton, described it as "deceptively fast mid-Sixties ska sample based crooning and toasting bouncy light cool reggae breeze". Sian Pattenden from Smash Hits gave "Tease Me" three out of five, noting that "this has a "backbeat" that's something else and a gloppy Indian drum which sets it apart. Music you go down to the wilderness of the country to."

Music video
A music video was produced to promote the single. It depicts the duo performing prancing around in a busy African city. Other scenes show them driving around in a red car or performing on the beach. Female dancers follow the duo. In between, there is footage of different people and scenes of the daily life in the city. The video was A-listed on France's MCM in November 1994.

Charts and certifications

Weekly charts

Year-end charts

Certifications

References

1993 songs
1993 singles
Chaka Demus & Pliers songs
Mango Records singles
Song recordings produced by Sly & Robbie